Nickolaus Mowrer (born September 14, 1988, in Miles City, Montana) is an American sport shooter. He is a three-time NRA Intercollegiate Pistol Champion in the free pistol (FP), a 2011 U.S. pistol shooting champion, and also, a resident athlete of the United States Olympic Training Center in Colorado Springs, Colorado, under his personal coach Sergey Luzov. At the 2011 Pan American Games in Guadalajara, Mexico, Mowrer missed out on a bronze medal by 5.5 points, finishing in 4th behind Júlio Almeida of Brazil in the men's free pistol, with a total score of 634.4 (545 in the preliminary rounds and 89.4 in the final).

Mowrer qualified for the men's 50 m pistol, along with his teammate Daryl Szarenski, at the 2012 Summer Olympics in London, after placing second and edging out former Olympian Brian Beaman from the U.S. Olympic Team Trials in Fort Benning, Georgia, with a final score of 1,855.5. Mowrer scored a total of 558 points in the qualifying rounds by a single inner ten behind Thailand's Jakkrit Panichpatikum, finishing only in fifteenth place.

He has qualified to represent the United States at the 2020 Summer Olympics.

He is currently a staff sergeant in the United States Army Reserves.

References

External links

USA Shooting Profile
NBC Olympics Profile

1988 births
Living people
American male sport shooters
American military Olympians
United States Distinguished Marksman
Olympic shooters of the United States
Shooters at the 2012 Summer Olympics
Shooters at the 2011 Pan American Games
People from Miles City, Montana
Sportspeople from Montana
Shooters at the 2015 Pan American Games
Pan American Games medalists in shooting
Pan American Games silver medalists for the United States
Shooters at the 2019 Pan American Games
Medalists at the 2019 Pan American Games
Shooters at the 2020 Summer Olympics
United States Army non-commissioned officers
United States Army reservists